Weisenheim may refer to:
 Weisenheim am Berg
 Weisenheim am Sand